Franz Benda baptised 22 November 1709, Benátky nad Jizerou – 7 March 1786, Potsdam) was a Bohemian violinist and composer, who worked for much of his life at the court of Frederick the Great.

Life
Benda was born in Old Benatek in Bohemia, the son of Jan Jiří Benda. His brother was the composer Georg Benda. Benda's daughter Juliane Reichardt (1752–1783) and his granddaughter Louise Reichardt (1779–1826) were also composers. Benda wrote his autobiography in 1763: it not only gives a detailed account of his own life but also a valuable record of the lives of other musicians whom he encountered during his career.

In his youth Benda was a chorister in Prague and afterward in the Chapel Royal at Dresden. At the same time he began to study the violin, and soon joined a company of strolling musicians who attended fetes, fairs, etc. At eighteen years of age Benda abandoned this wandering life and returned to Prague, going to Vienna, where he pursued his study of the violin under Johann Gottlieb Graun, a pupil of Tartini. After two years he was appointed chapel master at Warsaw. In 1732, he entered the service of Frederick the Great, then crown prince of Prussia, with whom he remained the rest of his life. He was a member of the crown prince's orchestra, and later became concertmaster to the king. He played about 50,000 concertos over a period of forty years. At Benda's request, Frederick allowed his parents and siblings to move to Potsdam when, as Protestants, they suffered religious persecution in Bohemia.

Benda was a master of all the difficulties of violin playing, and the rapidity of his execution and the mellow sweetness of his highest notes were unequalled. He had many pupils and wrote a number of works, chiefly exercises and studies for the violin.

Benda died in the Nowawes, a small colony near Potsdam set up by Frederick the Great to house Protestant refugees fleeing religious persecution in Bohemia.

Legacy
Descendants of Benda also continue in the same musical line. In the 20th century, František Benda was a composer of film scores and other works. The Benda Chamber Orchestra, which carries and honours the name of the Benda musical family, was founded in 1956 in Ústí nad Labem, Northern Bohemia (Czech Republic).
One of his descendants, Jean Sebastian Benda, acclaimed Swiss pianist, lived in Brazil, having married the pianist Luzia Benda.  After his return to Europe, in 1981, along with his wife and children born in Brazil,  his family follows the musical tradition of their ancestors.

Compositions

Benda composed 17 symphonies, numerous concerti and sonatas for violin, and other chamber works.

See also 
 Benda (surname)
 Benda

Notes

References

External links

www.closelinks.com Free Family Tree
Brief HOASM biography
Review of disc with concertos by both brothers

1709 births
1786 deaths
People from Benátky nad Jizerou
18th-century Bohemian people
Czech expatriates in Germany
Czech Baroque composers
Czech male classical composers
Czech Classical-period composers
German classical composers
German male classical composers
Czech classical violinists
German classical violinists
Male classical violinists
German violinists
German male violinists
18th-century classical composers
18th-century German composers
18th-century German male musicians